Buffalo Mill Historic District is a national historic district located at Buffalo, Union County, South Carolina.  The district encompasses 190 contributing buildings and 2 contributing structures associated with the Buffalo Mill textile mill complex and mill village.  The mill complex includes the main mill, mill office, power house, ice factory, mill warehouse, company store, and company bank/drug store. The main mill building features applied stylized Romanesque Revival detailing. The mill village housing varies from large, free-classic, Queen Anne style supervisor's houses, to shingle-style bungalows, to simple, one-story, workers residences. The village also includes a school and a baseball field/park.

It was added to the National Register of Historic Places in 1990.

References

External links
Historic American Engineering Record (HAER) documentation, filed under SC Route 215, Buffalo, Union County, SC:

Historic American Engineering Record in South Carolina
Historic districts on the National Register of Historic Places in South Carolina
Queen Anne architecture in South Carolina
Romanesque Revival architecture in South Carolina
Buildings and structures in Union County, South Carolina
National Register of Historic Places in Union County, South Carolina